R U Tuff Enuff is the third album by American R&B singer Rebbie Jackson. This album was a different approach for Jackson, as it had a harder-edged street R&B sound that was very popular at the time—which was also exhibited on the La Toya album by Jackson's sister, La Toya Jackson.

The single "Plaything" peaked at number eight on the Billboard R&B charts, Jackson's highest-charting single since 1984's "Centipede." The title track was also released as a single, but it was not as commercially successful. Melle Mel guested on "R U Tuff Enuff."

Critical reception
People wrote that the "album is such a blank-sounding snore that—if dopey spelling is going to be insisted on—it might have been called Noise R Us."

Track listing
"Perfect Combination" (Everett Collins, David "Pic" Conley, David Townshend, Robbie Danzie) – 5:16
"Read Between the Lines" (Jack Ponti, David Conley, Vic Pepe, David Townshend) – 4:50
"This Love is Forever" (Everett Collins, Rebbie Jackson, David Conley, David Townshend) – 4:40
"R U Tuff Enuff" (Arthur McCallister, Rebbie Jackson, David Conley) – 4:10
"Plaything" (Joshua Thompson, Romeo Williams, Gene Lennon) – 4:56
"Friendship Song" (Joshua Thompson, David Conley, Gene Lennon) – 4:32
"Sweetest Dreams" (Joshua Thompson, Gene Lennon, Romeo Williams) – 4:08
"Distant Conversation" (Everett Collins, Derrick Culler, David Conley) – 5:17

Charts

References

1988 albums
Rebbie Jackson albums
Columbia Records albums
CBS Records albums